Mubarak al-Fadil led the Umma Reform and Renewal Party, an opposition political party in Sudan, until his arrest in 2007 for allegedly plotting to overthrow the Sudanese government.

References

National Umma Party politicians
Living people
Year of birth missing (living people)
Place of birth missing (living people)
21st-century Sudanese politicians